Osredek pri Podsredi is a settlement in the Municipality of Kozje in eastern Slovenia. It lies in the hills south and east of Podsreda. The area is part of the historical Styria region. The municipality is now included in the Savinja Statistical Region.

Name
The name of the settlement was changed from Osredek to Osredek pri Podsredi in 1953.

Cultural heritage
On a hill known as Big Peak in the eastern part of the settlement, the remains of a prehistoric hillfort have been identified. Judging by finds of coins from the rule of Gallienus and Aurelian, the site was also used in the Roman period, probably as a refuge.

References

External links
Osredek pri Podsredi on Geopedia

Populated places in the Municipality of Kozje